The Shire of Bauhinia was a local government area in Central Queensland, Queensland, Australia.

The area is a staging point for expeditions to Carnarvon National Park.

History

On 11 November 1879, the Bauhinia Division was established as one of 74 divisions around Queensland under the Divisional Boards Act 1879 with a population of 1426.

On 4 January 1884, there was an adjustment of boundaries between Bauhinia Division's subdivisions Nos. 2 and 3 and the Duaringa Division. Soon after, on 20 March 1884, there was a further adjustment of boundaries between Bauhinia Division's subdivisions Nos. 1 and 3 and Duaringa Division.

With the passage of the Local Authorities Act 1902, Bauhinia Division became Shire of Bauhinia on 31 March 1903.

On 15 March 2008, under the Local Government (Reform Implementation) Act 2007 passed by the Parliament of Queensland on 10 August 2007, Bauhinia merged with the Shires of Duaringa, Peak Downs and Emerald (formerly part of Peak Downs) to form the Central Highlands Region.

Towns and localities
The Shire of Bauhinia included the following settlements:

 Arcadia Valley
 Arcturus
 Buckland
 Cairdbeign
 Cona Creek
 Consuelo
 Coorumbene
 Humboldt
 Lowesby
 Minerva
 Nandowrie
 Orion
 Rewan
 Rolleston
 Springsure
 Togara
 Wealwandangie

National parks
 Carnarvon National Park
 Nuga Nuga National Park

Chairmen
 1919: Michael Martin Kavanagh 
 1927: Michael Martin Kavanagh

Population

References

Further reading

External links
 Queensland Places: Bauhinia Shire

Former local government areas of Queensland
2008 disestablishments in Australia
Populated places disestablished in 2008
Central Highlands Region
1879 establishments in Australia